My Destiny is a Maxi single/EP by the symphonic metal band Leaves' Eyes, released on 24 July 2009. The songs "My Destiny" and "Northbound" are extracts from the then upcoming album Njord. The rest of the tracks are exclusive to this release.

On 28 August 2009, the band released the music video for the title track. In the video, a Norse warrior leaves his home to fight in a war after his wife gives him a necklace. While fighting, the necklace falls off and is retrieved by an enemy. He brings it back to the wife, telling her the owner is dead. She commits suicide by jumping off a cliff, her body later retrieved by her husband who is still alive. Angry, he slays several more enemies.

Track listing

Personnel

Leaves' Eyes
Liv Kristine Espenæs Krull – vocals
Alexander Krull – vocals, keyboards, programming, samples
Thorsten Bauer – guitars
Mathias Röderer – guitars
Alla Fedynitch – bass
Seven Antonopoulos – drums

Additional musicians
Lingua Mortis Orchestra from Minsk, Belarus, directed by Victor Smolski
Al dente Choir from Kleinbottwar, Germany, directed by Veronika Messmer
Christian Roch - Uilleann pipes on "Scarborough Fair"

Production
Alexander Krull - producer, engineer, mixing and mastering at Mastersound Studios
Mathias Röderer, Thorsten Bauer - assistant engineers
Victor Smolski - orchestra recording engineer

Charts

References

External links
Official website of Leaves' Eyes

2009 EPs
Leaves' Eyes albums
Napalm Records EPs